Seacon Bangkae is a shopping plaza and complex in Bangkok, Thailand. Originally, this department store was named Future Park Bang Khae, which is owned by Bangkok Commercial Asset Management Public Co., Ltd. On August 1, 2010, Seacon Bangkae Co., Ltd acquired this property, and renovation to the old building began in May 2011. Around 70 per cent of the renovation process was done to the old building. After that, it was publicly opened on September 15, 2012. Wave-shaped modern contemporary design was the concept of Seacon Bangkae. It also has three multi-purpose area for activities and events. The parking area can accommodate more than 4,000 cars. 31 August 2014

Location 
Seacon Bangkae is located in Phasi Charoen District of Bangkok.

Facilities 
Seacon Bangkae is separated into several sections, such as, Sport World, Seacon Fashion Mall, Mobile Seacon, IT Seacon, The Rink Ice Arena, Mega HarborLand, and Grand EGV Seacon Bangkae.

 Stores in Central Group
 Tops
 B2S
 Power Buy
 Supersports
 Office Mate
 Don Don Donki
 HomePro (Moved to The Mall Bangkae)
 Sport World
 IT Seacon
 Seacon Fashion Mall
 The Rink Ice Arena
 Mega HarborLand Seacon Bangkae
 Grand EGV 10 Cinemas

References

Buildings and structures in Bangkok
Shopping malls in Bangkok